Vaivara was the largest of the 22 concentration and labor camps established in occupied Estonia by the Nazi regime during World War II. It had 20,000 Jewish prisoners pass through its gates, mostly from the Vilna and Kovno Ghettos, but also from Latvia, Poland, Hungary and the Theresienstadt concentration camp. Vaivara was one of the last camps to be established. It existed from August 1943 to February 1944.

Creation
On 21 June 1943, Heinrich Himmler ordered the liquidation of the remaining ghettos in the Baltic states. Subsequently, German occupation authorities met under the auspices of the Commander of the Security Police and SD in Reval (the German name for the Estonian capital Tallinn) in order to plan the establishment of forced labor camps for the oil-shale extraction operations of Baltöl, an IG Farben subsidiary. Beginning in August 1943, a series of concentration camps was established all over Estonia by the Organisation Todt. In September 1943, took over from the OT. The administrative center of the camp complex was located in Vaivara with Hans Aumeier, a former camp commander in Auschwitz, in charge. He was assisted by Hstf. Max Dahlmann, Hstf. Kurt Pannicke and Helmut Schnabel. Franz von Bodmann was the camp's surgeon. Altogether only 15 Germans served in the camp, most of the guards were provided by Estonian and Russian auxiliaries of the 287th and 290th Security Battalions (Schutzmannschaftsbataillone).

The camp was established in the beginning of August 1943 near the Vaivara train station. It served as the main camp (Hauptlager) of 20 forced labor camps located throughout Estonia, some of which existed for brief times, and all together being commonly referred to as the Vaivara [concentration] camp complex. At first the camp was run by the OT, but after a few weeks Kurt Pannicke took over. When Pannicke took over the Narva subcamp at the end of September, Helmut Schnabel became commander. In autumn 1944, some of the inmates were evacuated by sea to the Stutthof concentration camp. From there they were distributed to the satellite camps of Natzweiler-Struthof concentration camp.

Conditions and prisoners
Since the main purpose of the camps was the fullest exploitation of the work capacity of their inmates, no large-scale killings of the able-bodied took place in the camps. Prisoners in the concentration camp had to work in the nearby forest, a quarry, or in the oil shale extraction. Those prisoners too old or too sick to work were killed in Selektionen (selections), as were children. The first such selection took place in the autumn of 1943, when 150 Jewish men and women were shot in the nearby woods. A second selection involved 300 Jews, most of them suffering from typhoid fever. In twenty more selections, approximately 500 more Jewish prisoners were murdered, including a group of children.

From Bodmann's reports, the camp population in the whole complex was 6,982 in October 1943, 9,207 in November 1943, 8,210 in February 1944 and 6,662 in June 1944.

In December 1943, a typhoid epidemic broke out in the camps, resulting in the deaths of 20 per cent of the camp population.

Evacuation
With the front coming closer in early 1944, the Vaivara camp was evacuated on 4 and 5 February 1944. 2,466 inmates were marched to the camps at Kiviõli, Ereda, Jõhvi and Goldfields. The inmates had to walk for three days in bad winter weather with poor clothing, footwear and food. The columns were also attacked by Soviet aircraft.

In July 1944, Bodmann held a strict selection, known as Ten Percent Selection, when one in ten of the inmates was selected and shot near Ereda. In August and September, as Germans prepared the evacuation of Estonia, the inmates were sent to the west. As there were not enough ships, they crowded in the camps of Klooga and Lagedi. On 19 September 1944, about 2,000 inmates of the Klooga camp were executed and the corpses burned on pyres. Similar mass executions took place at Lagedi.

Aftermath
Aumeier was tried at the Auschwitz trial in Poland in 1947 and executed. In 1951, the Soviets tried a number of Estonian auxiliaries. Brenneis was killed at the end of the war. Bodmann committed suicide in May 1945. Pannicke disappeared after the war. Schnabel was sentenced in Germany to 16 years imprisonment in 1968, which was reduced to 6 years in 1969. However, he was given a life sentence after another trial in 1977. Others were indicted but never tried by German courts.

Satellite camps
Satellite camps of Vaivara concentration camp were located in: 
Aseri (near Aseri)
Auvere
Ereda, with branches in Goldfields (now Kohtla – Kohtla shale oil factory) and Kohtla-Nõmme.
Hungerburg (now Narva-Jõesuu)
Ilinurme (either in Ilistvere or Illuka)
Jägala
Jõhvi
  (now in Opolye volost, Kingiseppsky District, Leningrad Oblast, Russia)
Kiviõli
Klooga, with branches in Laoküla and Paldiski.
Kūdupe (in northern Latvia)
Kukruse
Kunda
Kuremäe
Lagedi (two transportation camps from July to August and from August to September.)
Narva (according to Eugenie Gurin-Loov the site is located in nowadays Russia.)
Pankjavitsa (various spellings), now , Russia
Petseri
Putki (in Kose Parish, Viru County)
Saka
Sonda
Soska (near the Agusalu Lake, 1.5 km east of Agusalu)
Ülenurme
Viivikonna

See also
 List of Nazi concentration camps

Notes

References
 Encyclopedia of the Holocaust vol. III, Vaivara
 Ruth Bettina Birn, Vaivara, in: United States Holocaust Memorial Museum (ed.) (2009): Encyclopedia of Camps and Ghettos, 1933–1945. Vol. I, Part B, pp. 1491–1509.
 Mark Dworzecki (1970): Jewish Camps in Estonia, Jerusalem, Yad Vashem.
 Riho Västrik, Meelis Maripuu: Vaivara Concentration Camp in 1943-1944, in: Estonian International Commission for the Investigation of Crimes Against Humanity (ed.) (2006): Estonia 1940-1945, pp. 719–738.

Vaivara concentration camp
Generalbezirk Estland
Ida-Viru County
1943 in Estonia
1944 in Estonia